Rhyniella is a genus of fossil springtails (Collembola) from the Rhynie chert, which formed during the Pragian stage of the Early Devonian. One species has been described, Rhyniella praecursor. For some time it was believed to be the only hexapod from the Early Devonian. It was once considered to be the same animal as Rhyniognatha.

History
Its remains were discovered in 1919. Reconstructed from the scattered bits and pieces of its exoskeleton, R. praecursor was described in 1926, and at first believed to be a larval insect.

Mouthparts initially assigned to R. praecursor were redescribed as Rhyniognatha hirsti in 1928. In later studies, Rhyniognatha hirsti was found to be an insect or myriapod.

Description
Rhyniella grew to a length of about 1–2 mm and would have been a scavenger, feeding on rotting matter.

References

†
Devonian animals of Europe
Devonian arthropods
Fossil taxa described in 1926
Transitional fossils